The 1997 Penn Quakers football team was an American football team that represented the University of Pennsylvania during the 1997 NCAA Division I-AA football season. Penn finished last in the Ivy League after forfeiting five wins. 

In their sixth year under head coach Al Bagnoli, the Quakers outscored opponents 250 to 113 and compiled a 6–4 record on the field. They later forfeited five victories, however, yielding a final record of 1–9. John Bishop was the team captain.

Penn agreed to forfeit all of its Ivy League wins after an internal investigation showed that All-Ivy defensive tackle Mitch Marrow had not been a full-time student during the football season, and was thus ineligible to play on the team. The decision was announced in early January 1998, a month and a half after the season ended.  

This decision had a profound impact on the league standings. Penn had gone 5–2 against Ivy competition, outscoring its conference rivals 149 to 117. At season's end, Penn was reported as the third-place team. After the forfeits, record books show Penn with an 0–7 league record, finishing in last place. 

Penn played its home games at Franklin Field on the university's campus in Philadelphia, Pennsylvania.

Schedule

References

Penn
Penn Quakers football seasons
Penn Football